Raymond "Hallelujah" Joval (born 15 September 1968) is a Dutch professional boxer who held the International Boxing Organization middleweight title from 2000 to 2004 and again from 2005 to 2006.

Joval represented the Netherlands at the 1992 Olympics, defeating Likou Aliu of Western Samoa before being eliminated by Ahmed Dine of Algeria.

He has a career professional record of 37 wins and 5 defeats. His first professional fight was on 8 January 1994. Joval became the IBO Middleweight Champion after he defeated Mpush Makambi on 30 September 2000. He relinquished the title in 2004. He became IBO Middleweight champion once more, from 2005 until relinquishing it again in 2006.

References

External links
 
World 1993

1968 births
Living people
Middleweight boxers
Boxers at the 1992 Summer Olympics
Olympic boxers of the Netherlands
Boxers from Amsterdam
International Boxing Organization champions
Dutch male boxers
Dutch sportspeople of Surinamese descent
AIBA World Boxing Championships medalists